Sukhumvit MRT station is an MRT station on the Blue Line, located below Asok Intersection between Sukhumvit Road and Asok Montri Road in Bangkok, Thailand. The station provides an interchange with the BTS Sukhumvut Line. It is one of the busiest stations on the network.

The station has three underground levels including a shopping zone.

Connection with BTS 
The station is connected to BTS Asok station via covered walkway. Fare and ticket system between the two lines are not integrated.

Nearby attractions

 Siam Society
 Soi Cowboy
 Embassy of India
 Srinakharinwirot University 
 Benchakitti Park

Department stores 

 Robinson
 Timesquare
 Sukhumvit Plaza
 Foodland Supermarket
 Terminal 21

Offices

 Interchange 21 Tower
 Exchange Tower
 GMM Grammy Place
 BB Tower

Hotels
 Sheraton Grande Sukhumvit Hotel

References

MRT (Bangkok) stations
Railway stations opened in 2005
2005 establishments in Thailand